Thais in Singapore refers to people who are holding Thai citizenship or people of Thai descent who were born or residing in Singapore. With a population of 47,700 in 2012, according to Thailand's Thai Consular, they are the 8th largest overseas Thai community and 2nd largest in Southeast Asia.

History

During Singapore's construction boom in the 1980s and early 1990s, Thai migrant workers made up the bulk of foreign construction workers in the country. They arrived by bus into Singapore by the thousands from Thailand to work on infrastructure projects around the country. Golden Mile Complex was a common pick up and drop off point for these buses resulting in the emergence of more Thai businesses such as restaurants, tour agencies, Thai newspaper stands around the area and the place was colloquially known by locals as 'Little Thailand'.

Today, there are lesser Thai construction workers in Singapore as the construction workforce relies more on workers from China and South Asia.

Notable Thai temples in Singapore

 Wat Ananda Metyarama Thai Buddhist Temple, oldest Theravadin Buddhist Temple in Singapore
 Palelai Buddhist Temple
 Uttamayanmuni Buddhist Temple, of Kelantanese Thai origin
 Kancanarama Buddhist Temple, joint with a Taoist temple under the same temple complex

Notable people
Ben Davis, a Thai footballer playing for Port, on loan from Oxford United.
Pornsak Prajakwit, a Thai Chinese actor based in Singapore.
Vanessa-Mae, a British violinist with a Thai father and Singaporean mother.
Vernetta Lopez, a Singaporean actress and DJ.

See also
Thai people
Thai diaspora
Thais in Hong Kong
Malaysian Siamese
Singapore–Thailand relations

References

Ethnic groups in Singapore
Thai diaspora in Asia
Singaporean people of Thai descent
Immigration to Singapore